Así es el tango  is a 1937 Argentine romantic drama film musical directed and written by Eduardo Morera, based on a play by Florencio Chiarello. Starring Tita Merello and Tito Lusiardo. The film is an Argentine tango film a hugely popular genre of the period and Argentine culture.

Cast
 Olinda Bozán
 Tito Lusiardo
 Luisa Vehil
 Tita Merello
 Fernando Ochóa
 José Ramírez
 Eduardo Armani
 Olga Mom
 Lely Morel
 Carlos Enríquez

External links
 

1937 films
1930s Spanish-language films
1937 romantic drama films
Tango films
Argentine black-and-white films
Films directed by Eduardo Morera
Argentine romantic musical films
1930s romantic musical films
Argentine musical drama films
1930s musical drama films
1930s Argentine films